Dorymyrmex silvestrii is a species of ant in the genus Dorymyrmex. Described by Gallardo in 1916, the species is endemic to Argentina.

References

Dorymyrmex
Hymenoptera of South America
Insects described in 1916